The 1986 Asian Junior Athletics Championships was the inaugural edition of the international athletics competition for Asian under-20 athletes, organised by the Asian Athletics Association. It took place from 4–7 December in Jakarta, Indonesia. A total of 40 events were contested, 22 for male athletes and 18 for female athletes.

Medal summary

Men

Women

1986 Medal Table

References

Results
Asian Junior Championships 1986. World Junior Athletics History. Retrieved on 2013-10-19.

External links
Asian Athletics official website

Asian Junior Championships
Asian Junior Athletics Championships
International athletics competitions hosted by Indonesia
Sport in Jakarta
Asian Junior Athletics Championships
Asian Junior Athletics Championships
1986 in youth sport